Viktor Viktorovych Andrushchenko (born 10 May 1986) is a Ukrainian ice hockey player. He is currently playing with Sokil Kyiv of the Ukrainian Professional Hockey League (BXL).

Andrushchenko made his Kontinental Hockey League (KHL) debut playing with HC Dinamo Minsk during the 2008–09 KHL season.

References

External links
 

1986 births
Living people
HC Dinamo Minsk players
HK Mogilev players
HC Shakhtyor Soligorsk players
Sokil Kyiv players
Sportspeople from Kyiv
Ukrainian ice hockey forwards